The Swiss Insurance Association (SIA) represents the interests of the private insurance industry at national and international level.

Aims 
Swiss private insurers are of vital economic importance. They assume and cover companies’ and private individuals’ financial risks. The association is committed to ensuring an economically viable and sustainable framework for these activities. It works to maintain and promote a liberal and socially acceptable market and competitive system.

The SIA is mainly active in the following fields:

social security (occupational pensions, life insurance)
medical insurance, accident insurance
insurance law and supervision
competition and regulation
economic and fiscal policy
climate and environment protection
health promotion activities
education and training

Members 
The association has approximately 70 members, which include many specialist, national-level property, life and supplementary health insurers, and global primary insurers and reinsurers. Private insurers employ about 50,000 people in Switzerland. The sector is among the most productive and highest value-adding of the economy. With their expertise in risk coverage and hazard prevention, private insurers assume economic responsibility: they make a significant contribution to the stability of Switzerland's economic system and prosperity. With that in mind, the SIA is committed to the sustainable development of the sector and its locations.

Structure 
The SIA is an association (“Verein”) in accordance with art. 60 ss. of the Swiss Civil Code. Its main bodies are elected by the general assembly. The Managing Board sets the objectives and establishes the strategy of the SIA; it also monitors the activities of the head office. Committees and commissions, consisting of highly qualified representatives of the membership, are in charge of drafting solutions in the interest of the entire insurance industry. The SIA head office is divided into the three divisions “Insurance Strategy and Regulation”, “Public Affairs and Communications” and “Directorate”.

History 
The history of the private insurance industry goes back to the 19th century when the first private insurance companies were founded. Many of these companies are active to this day, namely Mobiliar (founded in 1826), Swiss Life (1857), Helvetia (1858), Bâloise (1863), Swiss Re (1863), Zurich (1872) or Winterthur (1875). The SIA’s predecessor – the “Verband concessionierter schweizerischer Versicherungs-Gesellschaften” – was founded in 1900 and made up of 21 insurance companies. Today the association is called SIA and has some 80 members.

Supervisory authority 
The member companies of the SIA are subject to supervision by the Swiss Financial Market Supervisory Authority (FINMA). Compulsory basic health insurance, the Swiss Accident Insurance Institution SUVA, the cantonal buildings insurers and the autonomous pension funds are not considered private insurers. FINMA is in charge of client protection and monitors the insurers’ ability to continuously meet their contractual obligations. The SIA shares the general interest in a strong and competent regulator.

Memberships 
The SIA is a member of national and international associations and organisations. It represents its members’ interests and concerns namely vis-à-vis economiesuisse, the Swiss Employers Confederation  and the Swiss Chamber of Commerce. Its membership in the European (re)insurance federation Insurance Europe and the Global Federation of Insurance Associations GFIA are of particular relevance.

References

External links 
Website of the SIA

Trade associations based in Switzerland
Insurance industry organizations